The Orebites or Lesser Taborites, later known as Sirotci ("Orphans"), officially Orphans' Union, were followers of a radical wing of the Hussites in Bohemia. The founders took part in the procession on Mount Oreb, near Třebechovice pod Orebem and Hradec. Founded in 1423 originally under the name Lesser Tábor, it consisted mostly of poorer burghers and some members of the Czech nobility who joined with the commander Jan Žižka.

The ideological founder of the Orebites was the priest Ambrož Hradecký. Leaders included Hynek Krušina of Lichtenburg and Diviš Bořek of Miletínek, the captain of the Hussites in Eastern and Central Bohemia. The Orebites were instrumental in the burning of the Benedictine monastery in Mnichovo Hradiště in the early summer of 1420, and in autumn, they supported the rest of the Hussites at the Battle of Vyšehrad.

After Žižka's death (1424), "orphaned" combatants adopted their new name. From 1424 to 1428, they were led by the priest Ambrož of Hradec and then by another priest, Prokop the Lesser. Hejtman Jan Čapek of Sány was elected as their military commander (1431–1434). After 1457, most supporters belonged to the Bohemian Brethren church and played an important role in its development.

Towns joined with the Union 
All towns are in Bohemia, unless otherwise noted.
 Vysoké Mýto
 Čáslav
 Kouřim
 Kolín
 Kutná Hora (in condominium with the Taborites)
 Trutnov
 Tachov (from 1427)
 New Town, Prague (from 1429)
 Český Brod
 Mladá Boleslav
 Boseň
 Hradec Králové
 Dvůr Králové
 Bělá pod Bezdězem
 Bezděz
 Česká Lípa
 Litomyšl
 Náchod
 Český Dub
 Topoľčany in Slovakia
 Skalica in Slovakia

Aristocratic members 
 Jan Roháč z Dubé
 Jan Kolúch z Vesce
 Čáslav Kaplíř ze Sulevic
 Vilém Jeník z Mečkova
 Jan Hertvík z Rušinova
 Wilhelm Kostka von Postupice
 Jan Žampach z Potštejna
 Mikuláš starší Trčka z Lípy
 Jiří z Dubé
 Jan Baštín z Porostlé
 Matěj Salava z Lípy
 Jan Krušina z Lichtenburka
 Aleš Vřešťovský z Rýzmburka
 Mikuláš z Keuschberka
 Anežka z Trocnova

References
 

Hussite Wars
Jan Žižka